Rhymbomicrus is a genus of beetles in the family Anamorphidae. There are at least four described species in Rhymbomicrus.

Species
These four species belong to the genus Rhymbomicrus:
 Rhymbomicrus caseyi Pakaluk, 1987
 Rhymbomicrus hemisphaericus (Champion, 1913)
 Rhymbomicrus lobatus (LeConte & Horn, 1883)
 Rhymbomicrus stephani Pakaluk, 1987

References

Further reading

 

Coccinelloidea genera
Articles created by Qbugbot